The African sheepbush (Afrikaans: goeiekaroo, "good karoo", Pentzia incana) is a plant native to South Africa and Namibia. It ranges throughout the Succulent Karoo, Nama Karoo, renosterveld, and fynbos, and it is listed under the SANBI Red List as "safe" (LC).

The African sheepbush has been imported to Australia.

It is a reasonable grazing plant:

References 

Flora of Namibia
Flora of South Africa
incana
Plants described in 1898